Cytochrome P450, family 26, also known as CYP26, is an mammal cytochrome P450 monooxygenase family found in human genome. There are three members in the human genome, CYP26A1, CYP26B1 and CYP26C1. Synteny mapping of CYP26 family members showing linkages to CYP16 family members of many invertebrates, means the tetrapod's CYP26 may evolved from CYP16 of fish.

References 

Animal genes
26
Protein families